Sven Hans Jørgen Svensen (30 August 1856 – 15 October 1942) was a Norwegian schoolteacher, school inspector and politician.

Svensen was born in Kristiansand to sailor Harald Svensen and Gurine Johanne Hansdatter. He was elected representative to the Stortinget from the Market towns of Vest-Agder and Rogaland counties for the period 1922–1924, for the Liberal Party. For the following term he was a deputy representative.

References

1856 births
1942 deaths
Politicians from Kristiansand
Liberal Party (Norway) politicians
Members of the Storting